This is an alphabetical list of contestants on the Bulgarian version of Big Brother. More information for each individual housemate can be found on their respective series page.

The list is in alphabetical order of their first name or nickname.

Big Brother contestants

 Big Brother
 Vip Brother

Big Brother (Bulgarian TV series)
Big Brother (Bulgarian TV series)